Rafael Anchundia (born 12 May 1946) is an Ecuadorian boxer. He competed in the men's bantamweight event at the 1968 Summer Olympics. At the 1968 Summer Olympics in Mexico City, he received a bye in the Round of 64 but Anchundia then lost to Valerian Sokolov of the Soviet Union by decision in the Round of 32.

References

External links
 

1946 births
Living people
Ecuadorian male boxers
Olympic boxers of Ecuador
Boxers at the 1968 Summer Olympics
Sportspeople from Guayaquil
Bantamweight boxers
20th-century Ecuadorian people